Woburn Walk is a pedestrian street in Bloomsbury, London, that was designed by architect Thomas Cubitt in 1822, and it is one of the first examples of a pedestrian shopping street in the Regency era. Its name comes from Woburn Abbey, the main country seat of the Dukes of Bedford, who developed much of Bloomsbury.

The street is well-preserved, including the black painted bow-fronted shops windows. Several of the buildings are Grade II* listed (No. 1-9 and 9a, Woburn Walk). The walk shares the same building design with the adjacent Duke's Road, which however was built open to traffic.

As of today a number of shops, restaurants and a cafeteria are located on both sides of the walk.

Notable residents
From 1895 to 1919, the Irish poet, dramatist and Nobel Prize winner W. B. Yeats lived at what is today 5 Woburn Walk.

From 1905 to 1906, the novelist Dorothy Richardson lived in Woburn Walk, in the building number 6, opposite  where Yeats stayed. A blue plaque has been erected there in May 2015.

See also
Alley
Pedestrian zone
Shopping mall
Sicilian Avenue
Woburn Square
Woburn Place

References

Streets in the London Borough of Camden
Bloomsbury